Heversham is a civil parish in the South Lakeland District of Cumbria, England.  It contains 23 listed buildings that are recorded in the National Heritage List for England.  Of these, three are listed at Grade II*, the middle of the three grades, and the others are at Grade II, the lowest grade.  The parish contains the village of Heversham and the surrounding countryside.  The listed buildings include houses, farmhouses, farm buildings, a church and associated structures, a former school, boundary stones, and a war memorial.


Key

Buildings

References

Citations

Sources

Lists of listed buildings in Cumbria
Listed buildings